Bloomfield is an unincorporated community in Loudoun County, Virginia.  It is situated at the intersection of Airmont (VA 719) and Bloomfield (VA 626) Roads.

The town of Bloomfield was founded by the Virginia General Assembly on January 13, 1816.  The town was named for fields of wildflowers along the Blue Ridge near the town.  During the Civil War, Confederate forces under Maj. Gen J.E.B. Stuart biouvacked in Bloomfield during the Battle of Unison.  Later in the war Col. Mosby and his Rangers visited the town to divide up $173,000 they had robbed from a Union payroll train in West Virginia during the Greenback Raid.

The Ebenezer Baptist Churches were listed on the National Register of Historic Places in 1994.

References

Unincorporated communities in Loudoun County, Virginia
Washington metropolitan area
Unincorporated communities in Virginia
Populated places established in 1816
1816 establishments in Virginia